American singer, songwriter, dancer, and actress Britney Spears has received many awards and nominations. She was inducted into the Hollywood Walk of Fame at age 21, making her the youngest artist in the recording industry to be awarded a star. She has been nominated for eight Grammy Awards and six American Music Awards, winning one from each of these and she has won eight Billboard Music Awards from 21 nominations, including the Millennium Award in 2016.

Upon their release, Spears's first two studio albums, ...Baby One More Time (1999) and Oops!... I Did It Again (2000), achieved commercial success and made her the best-selling teenage artist of all time, according to Guinness World Records. Though both albums received mixed critical response, the former won a Billboard Music Award and a Teen Choice Award, while the latter won two Billboard Music Awards.

In 2001, Spears released her self-titled third studio album, Britney. The album earned two Grammy nominations—Best Pop Vocal Album and Best Female Pop Vocal Performance for "Overprotected". The following year, Spears made her feature film debut with a leading role in Crossroads (2002), which was a box office success. However, the film received negative reviews from film critics, and Spears won Worst Actress at the 23rd Golden Raspberry Awards and Worst Original Song for "I'm Not a Girl, Not Yet a Woman". Her fourth studio album, In the Zone (2003), included "Toxic", which won the Grammy Award for Best Dance Recording.

In 2007, Spears released her fifth studio album, Blackout, for which she won Album of the Year at the MTV Europe Music Awards and International Album at the NRJ Music Awards. The album was added to the library and archives of the Rock and Roll Hall of Fame. The following year, she released her sixth album, Circus, which included the lead single "Womanizer". It won International Video of the Year at the 10th NRJ Music Awards. The song was also nominated for Best Dance Recording at the 52nd Annual Grammy Awards and Video of the Year at the 2009 MTV Video Music Awards. In 2009, she released the greatest hits album The Singles Collection, and the song "3" from the album debuted at number one on the Billboard Hot 100, making her the seventh female artist to achieve this milestone. In the same year, she was named the youngest female to have five number-one studio albums in the US by Guinness World Records.

At the 2011 MTV Video Music Awards, Spears was awarded the Michael Jackson Video Vanguard Award, becoming the third woman to win it. She also won Best Pop Video for "Till the World Ends", making her the only artist to receive this award three times. Spears previously held the record for most Teen Choice Awards with 11 wins before being surpassed by Taylor Swift in 2011. Spears was awarded the Icon Award by the Teen Choice Awards in 2015, Music Choice Awards in 2016, and Radio Disney Music Awards in 2017. She also received a Vanguard Award at the GLAAD Media Awards in 2018. In 2020, Rolling Stone named her debut single "...Baby One More Time" as the greatest debut single of all time, and listed Blackout at number 441 in their 500 Greatest Albums of All Time ranking.

Awards and nominations

Other accolades

State and cultural honors

World records

Notes

References

Citations

Bibliography

External links 
 

Britney Spears
Spears, Britney